The burning of Judas is an Easter-time ritual that originated in European Christian communities where an effigy of Judas Iscariot is burned. Other related mistreatment of Judas effigies include hanging, flogging, and exploding with fireworks.  A similar ritual in Jewish tradition would be the hanging and burning an effigy of Haman and his ten sons during Purim, although this is not a widespread contemporary practice.

Though not an official part of the Easter liturgical cycle, the custom is typically a part of the reenactment of the story of the Passion that is practiced by the faithful during Easter. Customs vary, but the effigy of Judas is typically hanged (reenacting ) on Good Friday, then burned on the night of Easter Sunday.

In many parts of Latin America this practice occurs on the eve of the New Year as a symbol of ridding one's self of evil and beginning a new year in spiritual purity. Some communities observe this ritual using various effigies, including the biblical Judas (who betrayed Jesus). This custom, during which the effigy is burned on a stake, is called "Quema del Judas" ("the burning of Judas") in Uruguay and Argentina, and "Quema del Año Viejo" ("the burning of the old year") in other places.

Practice

The burning of Judas was once widely practiced across the Christian world in England, Greece, Mexico, Brazil, Portugal, Germany, Austria, Czech Republic, Slovakia, Poland, Spain, Uruguay, Venezuela, Chile, Peru, Costa Rica, Cyprus where it is called 'lambratzia', the Philippines, Paraguay—where it is called 'Judas kái', Nigeria, and elsewhere. These folk traditions are still practiced today in many of those countries.

The Czech tradition of drowning and burning an effigy of Judas (vodění Jidáše) is still practiced in a number of villages in the Pardubice Region. The Czech mint issued a gold coin in 2015 to commemorate this folk custom, which was nominated for UNESCO protection as part of that nation's cultural heritage.

Judas burnings also took place in the district of Dingle, in Liverpool, England, in the early and mid-twentieth century, but was often stopped by the police. In Liverpool's South End bands of children still practiced this custom in the late twentieth century. The last burning of the Judas was in 1971 and was conducted by local legend Alan Rietdyk on waste ground between Prophet Street and Northumberland Street in the Liverpool 8 area. The burning of Judas is not traditional to England, although a very similar custom of burning Catholic rebel Guy Fawkes in effigy exists. The practice of burning an effigy of the Pope Paul V also continues to exist in England, where as many as 50,000 Protestants gather on Bonfire Night in Lewes to observe the festivities.

Antisemitism

The custom of "burning of Judas" (widespread around Greece and sometimes called "burning of the Jew"), as well as its repeated criticism by the Central Board of Jewish Communities in Greece (KIS) and official denunciation by the Greek Orthodox Church is regularly cited in the United States State Department's Religious Freedom Report for Greece. 
In Latin America, despite the controversial nature of anti-Semitism associated with the "burning of the Jew" (one of the custom's many monikers), although the practice does exist in the above stated form it is not regarded as an act of hostility towards the Jewish nation or ethnicity but is simply representative of "evil", thus not differing in any way from the other effigies listed.

In popular culture 
The tradition is featured in the 1974 Venezuelan homonymous film La quema de Judas.

References

External links
 Wikibooks:The Golden Bough/The Fire-Festivals of Europe

Passion plays
Judas Iscariot
Articles containing video clips
Christianity and antisemitism
Traditions involving fire